Johann Williams Farm is a historic farmhouse and related outbuildings located at Niagara Falls in Niagara County, New York.  It is a two-story frame dwelling built originally in the mid-1840s by Johann Williams, an immigrant to the area from Bergholtz, Prussia.  The original square, half timber structure was added to during the late 19th and early 20th centuries.  The property includes a number of notable farm outbuildings. When originally nominated, it was the last farm operating within the Niagara Falls city limits.

It was listed on the National Register of Historic Places in 1980.

It is a half-mile north of Love Canal.

References

Houses on the National Register of Historic Places in New York (state)
Houses completed in 1845
Houses in Niagara County, New York
National Register of Historic Places in Niagara County, New York
Farms on the National Register of Historic Places in New York (state)